Radhames Alviro Dijkhoff (born September 27, 1974) is an Aruban former Major League Baseball pitcher.

Dijkhoff was originally signed to his first contract as an amateur free agent by the Orioles on January 6, 1993, by scout Jesus "Chu" Halabi.. His cousin, Sidney Ponson, signed with the Orioles a few months later.

After pitching in the Orioles' minor league system for a few years, he made it to the big leagues for a brief stint with the Baltimore Orioles in 1998. On June 7 of that year, Radhames became the fourth Aruban to appear in the major leagues. A southpaw, Radhames lasted just one inning, giving up two hits, a walk, while striking a single batter out. He allowed two earned runs, giving him a gaudy career earned run average of 18.00, and wore the number 28 on his jersey.

After his brief major league stint, Dijkhoff returned to the minors. He continued to play in the Orioles system until being claimed on waivers by the New York Mets on April 6, 2000. During the 2000 season, he appeared in a combined 49 games for the Mets AA (Binghamton Mets)and AAA (Norfolk Tides) farm clubs, but was not called up to the major league squad. In , he pitched for the Arkansas Travelers in the Los Angeles Angels of Anaheim farm system to finish his professional career.

He is, to date, the only one of the five Aruban MLB players not to have been knighted in his native land.

References

External links

1974 births
Arkansas Travelers players
Aruban expatriate baseball players in the United States
Baltimore Orioles players
Binghamton Mets players
Bowie Baysox players
Delmarva Shorebirds players
Frederick Keys players
Gulf Coast Orioles players
High Desert Mavericks players
Living people
Major League Baseball pitchers
Major League Baseball players from Aruba
Norfolk Tides players
Rochester Red Wings players